Thanks for the Memory is a 1938 film directed by George Archainbaud and starring Bob Hope and Shirley Ross. The picture was adapted from the play by Albert Hackett and Frances Goodrich. The film is a remake of Up Pops the Devil (1931) starring Carole Lombard and Norman Foster. The titular song, "Thanks for the Memory", remained Bob Hope's theme song for the rest of his unprecedentedly long and successful career.

History
The film represented Paramount Pictures' attempt to capitalize on the overwhelmingly positive response to the Oscar winning song, "Thanks for the Memory," as performed by Hope and Ross in The Big Broadcast of 1938, released by the studio earlier the same year. The film plot, based on a 1930 stage play Up Pops the Devil by Frances Goodrich and Albert Hackett (previously filmed by Paramount in 1931, with Norman Foster and Carole Lombard) dealt with an out of work writer who stays home and plays house husband while his wife goes to work for her former fiancé.
The film features another popular song, "Two Sleepy People", which is again performed by Bob Hope and Shirley Ross and is often regarded as the companion to its predecessor, "Thanks for the Memory".

Cast

Bob Hope as Steve Merrick
Shirley Ross as Anne Merrick
Charles Butterworth as Biney
Otto Kruger as Gil Morrell
Hedda Hopper as Polly Griscom
Laura Hope Crews as Mrs. Kent
Emma Dunn as Mrs. Platt
Roscoe Karns as George Kent
Eddie "Rochester" Anderson as Janitor
Edward Gargan as Flanahan
Jack Norton as Bert Monroe
Patricia Wilder as Luella
William Collier Sr. as Mr. Platt
 June Brewster as Frances

References

External links

 (source material)

1938 films
American black-and-white films
1938 romantic comedy films
American romantic comedy films
American films based on plays
Films directed by George Archainbaud
1930s English-language films
1930s American films

Paramount Pictures films